From Here to Eternity is a 1953 American drama romance war film directed by Fred Zinnemann, and written by Daniel Taradash, based on the 1951 novel of the same name by James Jones. The picture deals with the tribulations of three U.S. Army soldiers, played by Burt Lancaster, Montgomery Clift, and Frank Sinatra, stationed on Hawaii in the months leading up to the attack on Pearl Harbor. Deborah Kerr and Donna Reed portray the women in their lives, and the supporting cast includes Ernest Borgnine, Philip Ober, Jack Warden, Mickey Shaughnessy, Claude Akins, and George Reeves.

The film won eight Academy Awards out of 13 nominations, including awards for Best Picture, Best Director (Fred Zinnemann), Adapted Screenplay, Supporting Actor (Frank Sinatra), and Supporting Actress (Donna Reed). The film's title originates from Rudyard Kipling's 1892 poem "Gentlemen-Rankers", about soldiers of the British Empire who had "lost [their] way" and were "damned from here to eternity".

In 2002, From Here to Eternity was selected for preservation in the United States National Film Registry by the Library of Congress as being "culturally, historically, or aesthetically significant".

Plot
In 1941, bugler and career soldier Private Robert E. Lee Prewitt transfers from Fort Shafter to a rifle company at Schofield Barracks on the island of Oahu. Because Prewitt was also a boxer, Captain Dana "Dynamite" Holmes wants him on his regimental team. Prewitt refuses. Consequently, Holmes makes Prewitt's life miserable and ultimately orders First Sergeant Milton Warden to prepare a court-martial. Warden suggests doubling Prewitt's company punishment as an alternative. Prewitt is hazed by the other NCOs and is supported only by his close friend, Private Angelo Maggio.

Prewitt and Maggio join a social club where Prewitt becomes attracted to Lorene. Prewitt confides to her he quit boxing after blinding his sparring partner. At the club, Maggio has an argument with stockade Sergeant "Fatso" Judson. Later, at a local bar, Judson provokes Maggio and the two nearly come to blows before Warden intervenes.

Despite being warned, Warden risks prison when he starts seeing Holmes' wife Karen. Her marriage to Holmes is fraught with infidelity, exacerbated after the stillbirth of a child and Karen's subsequent infertility. Karen encourages Warden to become an officer, which would enable her to divorce Holmes and marry him.

Maggio is sentenced to the stockade after walking off guard duty and getting drunk, subjecting him to Judson's unqualified (and unauthorized) wrath. Prewitt discovers Lorene's name is really Alma and her goal is to make enough money at the club to go back to the mainland. Prewitt tells her his career is in the military, and the two wonder whether they have a future together.

A member of Holmes' boxing team, Sgt. Galovitch, picks a fight with Prewitt. The fight is reported to Holmes who observes without intervening. Holmes is about to punish Prewitt again, but when he is told that Galovitch started the fight, Holmes does nothing. The regimental commander observes Holmes' conduct and, after an investigation, orders his resignation in lieu of a court martial. Holmes' replacement, Captain Ross, reprimands the other NCOs, demotes Galovitch to private, and affirms there will be no more promotions through boxing.

Maggio escapes from the stockade after a brutal beating from Judson and dies in Prewitt's arms. Seeking revenge, Prewitt engages Judson in a back alley knife fight. Prewitt kills Judson, but is badly wounded and stays with Lorene. Warden covers for Prewitt's absence. 

Karen tells Warden that Holmes' resignation is forcing them back to the mainland, but Warden reveals he has no interest in becoming an officer, effectively ending their relationship. Warden promises her that they will meet somewhere some day.

The next morning, the Japanese attack Pearl Harbor, forcing the men at Schofield into action. Warden takes command ordering a breach of the ammo supply room and the making of coffee. Despite Lorene's pleas to stay with her, Prewitt attempts to rejoin his company, but is shot dead by military police when he refuses to halt. Warden identifies him as a good soldier, but a hardhead.

Days later, Karen and Lorene coincidentally stand next to each other on a ship going to the mainland. Karen tosses her leis into the sea wondering if she will ever return to Hawaii. Lorene tells Karen she is not returning and that her "fiancé", whom she identifies as Prewitt, was a bomber pilot who died heroically during the Pearl Harbor attack and was awarded a silver star (none of which is true). Karen recognizes the name, but says nothing.

Cast

Production

Hollywood legend has it that Frank Sinatra got the role in the film by means of his alleged Mafia connections, and it was the basis for a similar subplot in The Godfather. However, that has been dismissed on several occasions by the cast and crew of the film. Director Fred Zinnemann commented that "the legend about a horse's head having been cut off is pure invention, a poetic license on the part of Mario Puzo, who wrote The Godfather". One explanation of Sinatra's casting is that his then-wife Ava Gardner persuaded studio head Harry Cohn's wife to use her influence with him; this version is related by Kitty Kelley in her Sinatra biography.

Joan Crawford and Gladys George were offered roles, but George lost her role when the director decided he wanted to cast the female roles against type, and Crawford's demands to be filmed by her own cameraman led the studio to take a chance on Deborah Kerr, also playing against type.

Kim Stanley heavily campaigned for the role of Lorene, which later garnered an Academy Award for Donna Reed.

The on-screen chemistry between Lancaster and Kerr may have spilled off-screen; it was alleged that the stars became involved romantically during filming.

The songs "Re-Enlistment Blues" and "From Here to Eternity" were written by Robert Wells and Fred Karger.

Differences from the novel

Several of the novel's controversial plot points were changed or eliminated for the film to satisfy the Production Code Office and the U.S. Army. Army cooperation was necessary in order to shoot on location at Schofield Barracks, use training aircraft, and obtain military footage of Pearl Harbor for use in the film, as well as for cost reasons. According to screenwriter Daniel Taradash, both the Code Office and the Army were impressed by his script, which reduced the number of censorship problems.
  
In the novel, Lorene was a prostitute at a brothel, but in the film, she is a hostess at a private social club. Karen's hysterectomy in the novel was caused by the unfaithful Holmes transmitting gonorrhea to her, but in the film, her hysterectomy resulted from a miscarriage, thus avoiding the topic of venereal disease. The changes were made to meet Code Office standards.
  
In the novel, several of the enlisted men fraternize with homosexuals, and one soldier commits suicide as a result, but homosexuality is not mentioned or directly explored in the film. Again, the change was made to satisfy the Code Office. However, J. E. Smyth has written that the film's treatment of Judson's behavior towards Maggio "has all the indications of sexual abuse, and therefore reintroduces the fear of homosexuality in the 1930s military that the rest of the script had to repress for obvious reasons of censorship". 
  
In the novel, Captain Holmes ironically receives his desired promotion, and is transferred out of the company. In the film, Holmes is forced to resign from the Army under threat of court-martial for his ill-treatment of Prewitt. The Army insisted on this change, which the filmmakers reluctantly made. Director Zinnemann later complained that the scene where Holmes is reprimanded was "the worst moment in the film, resembling a recruiting short", and wrote, "It makes me sick every time I see it."
 
In the novel, Judson's systematic abuse of Maggio and other prisoners, including Prewitt himself at one point, is portrayed in detail. However, in the film, Maggio's abuse happens offscreen, and is told only verbally to Prewitt, who remains free. The Army required that the abuse of Maggio not be shown, and that Judson's behavior towards Maggio be portrayed as "a sadistic anomaly, and not as the result of Army policy, as depicted in Jones' book". The filmmakers agreed, seeing these changes as improvements. Maggio, who survives and is discharged in the novel, dies in the film, having been combined with two other prisoner characters from the novel (one of whom is killed by Judson in the novel) to add drama and make Maggio a stronger, more tragic figure. The Army was further pacified by the filmmakers' inclusion of a line suggesting that Maggio's death was partially caused by his falling off a truck during a prison break, rather than solely by Judson's beatings.

Reception
Opening to rave reviews, From Here to Eternity proved to be an instant hit with critics and public alike, the Southern California Motion Picture Council extolling: "A motion picture so great in its starkly realistic and appealing drama that mere words cannot justly describe it."

Variety agreed:

The James Jones bestseller, From Here to Eternity, has become an outstanding motion picture in this smash screen adaptation. It is an important film from any angle, presenting socko entertainment for big business. The cast names are exceptionally good, the exploitation and word-of-mouth values are topnotch, and the prospects in all playdates are very bright, whether special key bookings or general run.

Of the actors, Variety went on to say,

Burt Lancaster, whose presence adds measurably to the marquee weight of the strong cast names, wallops the character of First Sergeant Milton Warden, the professional soldier who wet-nurses a weak, pompous commanding officer and the GIs under him. It is a performance to which he gives depth of character as well as the muscles which had gained marquee importance for his name. Montgomery Clift, with a reputation for sensitive, three-dimensional performances, adds another to his growing list as the independent GI who refuses to join the company boxing team, taking instead the 'treatment' dished out at the C.O.'s instructions. Frank Sinatra scores a decided hit as Angelo Maggio, a violent, likeable Italo-American GI. While some may be amazed at this expression of the Sinatra talent versatility, it will come as no surprise to those who remember the few times he has had a chance to be something other than a crooner in films.

The New York Post applauded Frank Sinatra, remarking, "He proves he is an actor by playing the luckless Maggio with a kind of doomed gaiety that is both real and immensely touching." Newsweek also stated that, "Frank Sinatra, a crooner long since turned actor, knew what he was doing when he plugged for the role of Maggio." John McCarten of The New Yorker concurred, writing that the film "reveals that Frank Sinatra, in the part of Mr. Clift's best friend who winds up in the stockade, is a first-rate actor."

The cast agreed; Burt Lancaster commented in the book Sinatra: An American Legend that, "[Sinatra's] fervour, his bitterness had something to do with the character of Maggio, but also with what he had gone through the last number of years. A sense of defeat and the whole world crashing in on him... They all came out in that performance."

Despite the rivalry between their respective characters, Sinatra and Borgnine, both from Italian roots, became lifelong friends. They corresponded with each other at Christmas season by interchanging cards signed using their film character's names "Maggio" and "Fatso". At a Dean Martin Celebrity Roast honoring Sinatra, Borgnine mockingly reprised his Fatso Judson character.

The film was number one in the United States for four weeks during September 1953 with a gross of $2,087,000. With a final gross of $30.5 million equating to earnings of $12.2 million, From Here to Eternity not only became one of the highest-grossing films of 1953, but also one of the ten highest-grossing films of the decade. Adjusted for inflation, its box office gross would exceed US$277 million in 2017 dollars.

Despite the positive response of the critics and public, the Army was reportedly not pleased with its depiction in the finished film, and refused to let its name be used in the opening credits. The Navy also banned the film from being shown to its servicemen, calling it "derogatory of a sister service" and a "discredit to the armed services".

On Rotten Tomatoes, the film holds a rating of 88% from 96 reviews. The consensus summarizes: "It has perhaps aged poorly, but this languidly paced WWII romance remains an iconic, well-acted film, featuring particularly strong performances from Burt Lancaster and Montgomery Clift."

American Film Institute recognition
AFI's 100 Years...100 Movies: #52
AFI's 100 Years...100 Passions: #20

Awards and nominations

William Holden, who won the Academy Award for Best Actor for Stalag 17, felt that Lancaster or Clift should have won. Sinatra would later comment that he thought his performance of heroin addict Frankie Machine in The Man with the Golden Arm was more deserving of an Oscar than his role as Maggio.

Television
An unsuccessful 30 minute television pilot starring Darren McGavin as 1st Sgt Warden, Roger Davis as Pvt Pruitt, and Tom Nardini as Pvt Di Maggio was made in 1966.

In 1979, William Devane starred as 1st Sgt Warden in a miniseries that became a television series in 1980.

References

Notes

Bibliography

 Beidler, Philip D. The Good War's Greatest Hits: World War II and American Remembering. Athens, Georgia: University of Georgia Press, 1998. .
 Buford, Kate. Burt Lancaster: An American Life. New York: Knopf, 2000. .
 Dick, Bernard F., ed. "Chapter 6: An Interview with Daniel Taradash: From Harvard to Hollywood". Columbia Pictures: Portrait of a Studio. Lexington, Kentucky: University Press of Kentucky, 1992. .
 Dolan, Edward F., Jr. Hollywood Goes to War. London: Bison Books, 1985. .
 Eagan, Daniel. America's Film Legacy: The Authoritative Guide to the Landmark Movies in the National Film Registry. New York City: Continuum International Publishing Group, 2010. .
 Evans, Alun. Brassey's Guide to War Films. Dulles, Virginia: Potomac Books, 2000. .
 Hischak, Thomas S. American Literature on Stage and Screen: 525 Works and Their Adaptations. Jefferson, North Carolina: McFarland & Company, 2012. .
 Sinatra, Nancy. Frank Sinatra: An American Legend. Chappaqua, New York: Reader's Digest Association, 1995. .
 Smyth, J.E. Fred Zinnemann and the Cinema of Resistance. Jackson, Mississippi: University Press of Mississippi, 2014. .
 Suid, Lawrence H. Guts & Glory: The Making of the American Military Image in Film. Lexington, Kentucky: University Press of Kentucky, 2002. .

External links

 
 
 
 
 
 From Here to Eternity at Virtual History
 Script (pdf)
 From Here to Eternity essay by Daniel Eagan in America's Film Legacy: The Authoritative Guide to the Landmark Movies in the National Film Registry, A&C Black, 2010 , pages 471-473 

1953 films
1950s English-language films
1950s war drama films
1953 romantic drama films
Adultery in films
American black-and-white films
American romantic drama films
American war films
American World War II films
Best Picture Academy Award winners
Columbia Pictures films
Films about American military personnel
Films about the United States Army
Films based on American novels
Films based on military novels
Films directed by Fred Zinnemann
Films featuring a Best Supporting Actor Academy Award-winning performance
Films featuring a Best Supporting Actor Golden Globe winning performance
Films featuring a Best Supporting Actress Academy Award-winning performance
Films scored by George Duning
Films scored by Morris Stoloff
Films set in 1941
Films set in Hawaii
Films set in the 1940s
Films shot in Honolulu
Films that won the Best Sound Mixing Academy Award
Films whose cinematographer won the Best Cinematography Academy Award
Films whose director won the Best Directing Academy Award
Films whose director won the Best Director Golden Globe
Films whose editor won the Best Film Editing Academy Award
Films whose writer won the Best Adapted Screenplay Academy Award
Pearl Harbor films
Photoplay Awards film of the year winners
United States National Film Registry films
War romance films
1950s American films